The Särna alkaline complex is a group of intrusive igneous rocks in Dalarna, Sweden. Emplacement and cooling of  magma into rock occurred during the Carboniferous Period. The complex is aligned with the Oslo Rift, which formed around the same time; it is thought that they are related.

See also
Alnö Complex
Fen Complex
Kola Alkaline Province
Norra Kärr

References

Geology of Sweden
Paleozoic Sweden
Carboniferous Europe
Carboniferous geology
Geography of Dalarna County